Newspaper misprints may refer to:

Typographical error
Newspaper misprints, a humorous mini-section in Private Eye magazine.